In mathematics and probability theory, a gamma process, also known as (Moran-)Gamma subordinator,  is a random process with independent gamma distributed increments. Thus jumps whose size lies in the interval  occur as a Poisson process with intensity  The parameter  controls the rate of jump arrivals and the scaling parameter  inversely controls the jump size. It is assumed that the process starts from a value 0 at t = 0.

Properties

Some basic properties of the gamma process are:

Marginal distribution 
The marginal distribution of a gamma process at time  is a gamma distribution with mean  and variance 

That is, its density  is given by

Scaling 
Multiplication of a gamma process by a scalar constant  is again a gamma process with different mean increase rate.

Adding independent processes 
The sum of two independent gamma processes is again a gamma process.

Moments 
   where  is the Gamma function.

Moment generating function

Correlation 
, for any gamma process 

The gamma process is used as the distribution for random time change in the variance gamma process.

Literature 

 Lévy Processes and Stochastic Calculus by David Applebaum, CUP 2004, .

References 

Lévy processes